Little Buffalo Creek is a tributary of Buffalo Creek in Union County, Pennsylvania, in the United States. The creek is impacted by nutrients, sediment, E. coli, and thermal radiation. Rock formations containing sandstone, shale, and limestone occur in the watershed.

Most of the watershed of Little Buffalo Creek is on forested land or agricultural land, but there are other land uses as well. A number of bridges have been constructed over the creek. In 2014, a $329,851 grant from the Growing Greener program was issued to the Union County Conservation District for agricultural best management practices in its watershed. The creek's drainage basin is designated as a Coldwater Fishery and a Migratory Fishery and wild trout naturally reproduce in a reach of it. American eels have also been released into the creek.

Course

Little Buffalo Creek begins at the base of a mountain in White Deer Township. It flows south for a short distance before turning east-northeast and then east-southeast. Several tenths of a mile further downstream, the creek turns east-northeast for a few miles before turning south-southeast and entering a valley. After several tenths of a mile, it turns south and enters Kelly Township. The creek continues flowing south for some distance before meandering east for several tenths of a mile. It then turns south again for a few tenths of a mile before turning southwest. The creek then turns south-southeast, then east-northeast, before finally turning southwest. Several tenths of a mile further downstream, it reaches its confluence with Buffalo Creek.

Hydrology
Little Buffalo Creek is impacted by nutrients, sediment, E. coli, and thermal radiation.

The largest contributors of sediment to the creek in 2000 were streambank erosion and row crops. Hay and pastures contributed  and low-density urban land contributed .  came from other sources.

This equates to a unit area load of just under .

Geography and geology

There are also significant flood-prone areas along the creek, which, during a flood, could make access to emergency services in western Kelly Township difficult. There are some floodplain areas along the creek and its tributaries.

Little Buffalo Creek cuts through the Buffalo Mountain Anticlinal. Additionally, the Milton Anticlinal is located near the creek.

Outcroppings of the Ore sandstone are visible at the Buffalo Mountain Anticlinal on Little Buffalo Creek. Shales of the Bloomsburg Formation also occur in the watershed of the creek. Additionally, limestone of the Lower Helderberg Formation occurs near the creek.

Watershed
The mouth of the creek is in the United States Geological Survey quadrangle of Lewisburg. However, the source is in the quadrangle of Williamsport SE. The creek also flows through the quadrangle of Allenwood. It is one of the major tributaries of Buffalo Creek. The watershed makes up 14 percent of the Buffalo Creek drainage basin and is in the northeastern corner of that watershed.

Of these,  are in agricultural land. Forested land is more common in the watershed's upper reaches, while agricultural land is more common in the lower reaches. The creek does not flow through any protected areas, but its headwaters are not far from state forest lands. There are no major highways in the watershed, but Interstate 80 passes close to its northeastern edge.

A total of 54 percent of the watershed of Little Buffalo Creek is on forested land. Another 37 percent is on agricultural land. Only 3 percent of the watershed is impervious, but this could rise to 26 percent in the future. There are patches of commercial and residential land in the creek's watershed.

There are no unpaved roads in the watershed of Little Buffalo Creek.

History
Little Buffalo Creek was entered into the Geographic Names Information System on August 2, 1979. Its identifier in the Geographic Names Information System is 1179489.

A gristmill and a sawmill were built on Little Buffalo Creek during the winter of 1774 to 1775. It is on private property. A bridge built over the creek in 1850 was used as a route for transporting grain to Campbell's Mill.

A bridge carrying T-404 over Little Buffalo Creek was built before 1977.

In the 2008 report, the watershed of Little Buffalo Creek was ranked fourth amongst several sub-watersheds in the Buffalo Creek drainage basin for restoration priority. In 2014, the a $329,851 grant from the Growing Greener program was issued to the Union County Conservation District for agricultural best management practices in the creek's watershed.

Biology
The drainage basin of Little Buffalo Creek is designated as a Coldwater Fishery and a Migratory Fishery. Wild trout naturally reproduce on a reach of the creek from the T442 bridge downstream to the second State Route 1006 bridge. A group of spawning white suckers were observed in the creek in the 1920s.

A population of American eels was released into Little Buffalo Creek in 2013. The eels also carried with them the larvae of freshwater mussels. The aim of the project was to restore American eels and freshwater mussels to the ecosystem of the Susquehanna River.

In a 2008 study, Little Buffalo Creek was found to be less biologically impaired than expected given the amount of agricultural activity and livestock in its watershed. Additionally, some wetlands have been created along the creek by landowners to serve as waterfowl habitats and the Conservation Reserve Enhancement Program of the United States Department of Agriculture has installed riparian buffers on the creek in some formerly agricultural land.

The pathogen load of Little Buffalo Creek is 6.646 × 1015 organisms per month. 5.684 × 1015 of those organisms come from urban areas, while 9.564 × 1014 come from farm animals and 3.214 × 1012 come from septic systems. The remaining 2.182 × 1012 come from wild animals.

See also
Spruce Run (Buffalo Creek), next tributary of Buffalo Creek going upstream
List of rivers of Pennsylvania

References

Rivers of Union County, Pennsylvania
Tributaries of Buffalo Creek (West Branch Susquehanna River)
Rivers of Pennsylvania